The Memphis Cotton Exchange is located in downtown Memphis, Tennessee, United States, on the corner of Front Street and Union Avenue. It was founded in 1874 as a result of the growing cotton market in Memphis, where trade was strong after the American Civil War. The first Cotton Exchange building was constructed in 1885. It was replaced by the Exchange Building in 1910, which housed it until a newer Cotton Exchange Building was completed in 1925.

History & location
Cotton merchants needed a trade organization to regulate cotton marketing in the city. They were also aware of the many benefits reaped by the New York Cotton Exchange and the New Orleans Cotton Exchange. Once established, the exchange produced rules and regulation on cotton trading and set standards for buying and pricing cotton in Memphis and the mid-South. The exchange developed a method for grading cotton to which members agreed. It operated as a "spot market" and never developed futures trading except for two short-lived experiments. The exchange developed as a source of information about world markets, and cotton merchants found they had to join as members in order to compete. The exchange also promoted "Memphis cotton" in major markets such as New York and London.

For a time the Cotton Exchange was housed in what is now called the Exchange Building, built in 1910 on 9 North Second Street in Memphis. The tall, 20-story building credited to N. M. Woods housed both the Cotton and Merchant exchanges for a period. Since the decline of the exchanges in the late 20th century with diversification of the economy, it has been renovated for use as an apartment building.

When the exchanges decided to have separate locations, the Memphis Cotton Exchange had a multi-story building constructed on Union Avenue; the Cotton Exchange Building opened in 1922. Cotton trading was done on the first floor, and only members of the exchange were allowed to trade there. In 1978, the trading floor was closed in favor of computer trading. The historic floor has since been remodeled and is now home to The Cotton Museum; it is used to educate the public about the industry and agriculture of cotton, the commodity crop that built the wealth of the city of Memphis for decades.

Presidents of the Memphis Cotton Exchange

References

External links
 

Financial services companies established in 1874
1874 establishments in Tennessee
Commodity exchanges in the United States